Quoi de Neuf ("What's New") is a Canadian 24-hour news and information radio station, which airs on XM Satellite Radio channel 125. The station is primarily a loop of news programming, much of which was originally sourced from Corus Quebec's terrestrial news stations. Quoi de Neuf focused much more on entertainment and lifestyle news than its English counterpart, Canada 360.

However, due to budget issues, XM Radio Canada decided to release the staff at Quoi de Neuf.  In addition, the format was changed to news radio and is outsourced to the French-language broadcast arm of The Canadian Press, with a culture segment done in-house.

On November 12, 2008, Quoi de Neuf was moved from channel 245 to channel 125.

References

External links
 Quoi de Neuf
 XM Canada Quoi de Neuf 

XM Satellite Radio channels
Digital-only radio stations
Satellite radio stations in Canada
News and talk radio stations in Canada
French-language radio stations in Canada
Radio stations established in 2005
Defunct radio stations in Canada